The Parque Central, Havana is one of the best known and central sites of the city of Havana, Cuba. It is located between Prado, Neptuno, Zulueta and San José streets, and San Rafael Boulevard. Among the buildings surrounding the park are Gran Teatro de La Habana (The Great Theatre of Havana Alicia Alonso), the Hotel Inglaterra (England Hotel), the Hotel Telégrafo, el Hotel Parque Central (Central Park Hotel), la Manzana de Gómez, the Hotel Plaza and Museo Nacional de Bellas Artes.

Gardens

The gardens surrounding the statue of Jose Marti by José Vilalta Saavedra have a series of paths that intersect. There are 28 royal palms that signify  Martí's birth date, as well as 8 coffin-shaped stonework, representing medical students shot by the Spanish Government on the Island during the Ten Years' War  November 27, 1871.

See also
El Capitolio
Tacón Theatre
Gran Teatro de La Habana
Paseo del Prado, Havana
Jean-Claude Nicolas Forestier
José Vilalta Saavedra

References

Gallery

Buildings and structures in Havana